Pichhore is a town and a nagar panchayat in Gwalior district in the Indian state of Madhya Pradesh.
By-prabendra rajput
King of dhapora

Demographics
 India census, Pichhore had a population of 11,725. Males constitute 53% of the population and females 47%. Pichhore has an average literacy rate of 52%, lower than the national average of 59.5%: male literacy is 63%, and female literacy is 40%. In Pichhore, 17% of the population is under 6 years of age.

References

Cities and towns in Gwalior district